Live Emotion (ライブ・エモーション) is a live album by Kiyotaka Sugiyama & Omega Tribe released by VAP on March 30, 1986. The album charted at No. 6 on the Oricon charts.

Background 
The album is a recording of the band's final concert on December 24, 1985 at the Tokyo Shinjuku Welfare Pension Hall as part of their First Finale Tour in 1985. The band had previously released the compilation album Single's History on October 23 and their final album First Finale on December 11, days before the concert as composer Tetsuji Hayashi requested them for a final album. 

In the opening, two women are heard talking about the concert, one of which being Yuko Yanagisawa, the sister of comedian Shingo Yanagisawa and Sugiyama's wife.

Track listing

Personnel 

Kiyotaka Sugiyama – vocals
Shinji Takashima – guitar, backing vocals
Toshitsugu Nishihara – keyboards, backing vocals
Takao Oshima – bass, backing vocals
Keiichi Hiroishi – drums
Tetsuya Osaka – keyboards
Hiroyuki Iso – saxophone, percussion

Stage unit 

Yasuo Akagi – stage director (DAL Q)
Yoshiya Sato – lighting planner
Takao Sudo – lighting operator
Mariko Wataru – lighting operator
Hiroshi Suzuki – lighting operator
Akiyoshi Kudo – stage sound engineer (Hibino Sound)
Tsutomu Yoshizawa – stage sound engineer (Hibino Sound)
Kaoru Sugimoto – musical instruments (SAN Lease)
Ikuo Uchimura – transport
Shimizu Butai – stage art
Masaaki Komura – artist management
Ken Shiguma – director of music
Hiroyuki Sato – stage management assistant (DAL Q)
Tadahisa Fujita – stage management (DAL Q)

Special thanks 
Atsushi Kitamura
Katsuhiko Endo
Flip Side Co., LTD
Hands Co., LTD

Video unit 

Genichi Tanaka – technical director
Shigeyuki Amano – video mixer
Hiroshi Sei – camera operator
Tatsuo Hashii – camera operator
Keisuke Fukuhara – camera operator
Koichi Murakami – camera operator
Yasuo Yoshizawa – camera operator
Takayuki Fukuoji – camera operator
Kojuro Suzuki – audio
Masaaki Tanahashi – video engineer
Hajime Ichimoto – video engineer
Shozo Akashi – lighting
TAMCO – audio mobile facilities
Kunihiko Shimizu – audio recording and mixing
NTVV – additional video facility
Chiyoda Video – additional video facility
Yoshinari Miyama – assistant director
Kenichi Hasegawa – assistant director
Umeo Itoh – associate producer
Itaru Mizoguchi – producer
Masatoshi Yoshioka – producer and director
Koichi Fujita – executive producer

Special thanks 
Tetsuji Hayashi
Chinfa Kan
Yasushi Akimoto
Masako Arikawa
Kumiko Aoki
Show

Charts

References 

1986 live albums
Omega Tribe (Japanese band) albums